Errol Fuller (born 19 June 1947) is an English writer and artist who lives in Tunbridge Wells, Kent. He was born in Blackpool, Lancashire, grew up in South London, and was educated at Addey and Stanhope School. He is the author of a series of books on extinction and extinct creatures.

Reception

Extinct Birds
Andrew Sugden, reviewing Extinct Birds in the London Review of Books, notes that Fuller set out "to find at least one drawing, painting or lithograph: many by the great 19th-century illustrator J.G. Keulemans, a couple (great auk and Himalayan mountain quail) by Edward Lear. He also embellishes the historical account where possible with portraits of the sailors, explorers and naturalists who recorded (and sometimes helped to extinguish) a species and biographical snippets about them – all of which provides an important context for the extinctions themselves. Most of these species vanished, of course, before we had film of sufficient speed for wildlife photography", he found little to say about some of the species, "the lives and deaths of many species having passed almost unnoticed (which makes it all the more remarkable that Fuller was able to unearth so many pictures)", and contrasts this 18th century situation with what happens now, when there is often a mass of data on vanishing species.

John A. Burton, reviewing the book in Oryx, begins by saying "I must make it absolutely clear that this is a very useful, and well-researched book, which deserves to find a place on the shelves of any reasonable conservation-oriented library", and compliments Fuller on "his comprehensiveness and detail." He found the illustrations to include "splendid examples" of work by Edward Lear, Joseph Wolf and J.G. Keulemans.

The Great Auk

Writing in The Guardian, Claire Armitstead commented that "Errol Fuller's magnificent self-published The Great Auk" was "one of the most astonishing books to cross my desk", and wrote that it was

Dodo: From Extinction to Icon

Reviewing Dodo: From Extinction to Icon, Stephen Moss, also in The Guardian, wrote that Fuller has

The Passenger Pigeon

Reviewing Fuller's The Passenger Pigeon for The Guardian, the blogger GrrlScientist writes that the book's brief text provides a good introduction for people who know little about the bird, but that the book's primary purpose is "to provide a visual context for the history of passenger pigeons. Many of its pages are lavishly illustrated with rare photographs of the birds", while "Also included are some of the sketches and paintings, music and poetry that the pigeons inspired, as well as some items of historical interest."

Bibliography
Ching, Raymond; with Additional Text by Fuller, Errol (1981). Studies & Sketches of a Bird Painter. Melbourne/New York: Lansdowne Editions. 
Fuller, Errol (1987). Extinct Birds. Penguin Books. .
Fuller, Errol (1990). Kiwis. Seto Publishing Auckland. .
Fuller, Errol (1995). The Lost Birds of Paradise. Swan Hill Press. 
Fuller, Errol (1999). The Great Auk. 
Fuller, Errol (2000). Extinct Birds. Revised ed. Oxford University Press. 
Fuller, Errol (2002). Dodo: From Extinction to Icon. HarperCollins. 
Hoyo, J. and Elliott, A.  (2002).  Handbook of the Birds of the World. Volume 7: Jacamars to Woodpeckers. Introductory essay by Errol Fuller. Barcelona: Lynx Editions.
Fuller, Errol (2003). The Dodo: Extinction in Paradise. Bunker Hill Publishing Inc.
Fuller, Errol (2003). The Great Auk: The Extinction of the Original Penguin. Bunker Hill. 
Fuller, Errol (2004). Mammoths: Giants of the Ice Age. Bunker Hill. 
Fuller, Errol (2004). Lost Worlds. Doha, Qatar: National Council for Culture, Arts and Heritage. 
Fuller, Errol (2009). Dana Quarry and Its Dinosaurs. Dinosauria International.  .
Fuller, Errol (2010). Hedley Fitton: The Accent of Truth. Southern Cross the Dog Publishing. 
Attenborough, David and Fuller, Errol (2012). Drawn from Paradise: The Discovery, Art and Natural History of the Birds of Paradise. HarperCollins, UK. 
Fuller, Errol (2013). Lost Animals: Extinction and the Photographic Record. Bloomsbury. 
Fuller, Errol (2014). Voodoo Salon Taxidermy. Stacey International. 
Fuller, Errol (2014). The Passenger Pigeon. Princeton University Press.

Magazine articles
Fuller, Errol (April 1998). "Voyage of a Painter." Natural History (New York), pp. 12–14.

Filmography

Paintings

See also
Extinct Birds (Rothschild book)
Great auk
Dodo
Bird-of-paradise

References

External links
Official website

1947 births
Living people
British non-fiction writers
Ornithological writers
British bird artists
People from Blackpool
People educated at Addey and Stanhope School
English male writers
Male non-fiction writers